Philip Fraser (January 27, 1814 – July 26, 1876) was a United States district judge of the United States District Court for the Northern District of Florida.

Education and career

Born in Montrose, Pennsylvania, Fraser was an attorney in private practice in Jacksonville, Florida, and was Mayor of Jacksonville from 1855 to 1856.

Federal judicial service

On June 14, 1862, Fraser was nominated by President Abraham Lincoln to a seat on the United States District Court for the Northern District of Florida vacated by Judge McQueen McIntosh. Fraser was confirmed by the United States Senate on July 17, 1862, and received his commission the same day. Fraser served in that capacity until his death on July 26, 1876, in Montrose, Pennsylvania.

References

Sources
 

1814 births
1876 deaths
People from Montrose, Pennsylvania
Judges of the United States District Court for the Northern District of Florida
United States federal judges appointed by Abraham Lincoln
19th-century American judges
19th-century American politicians
Mayors of Jacksonville, Florida